Club Polideportivo Chinato is a Spanish football team based in Malpartida de Plasencia, in the autonomous community of Extremadura. Founded in 1969, it plays in Primera División Extremeña – Group 1, holding home games at Campo de Fútbol Eras de las Matas, with a 1,000-seat capacity.

Season to season

2 seasons in Tercera División

External links
Official website 
fexfutbol.com profile 
Futbolme.com profile 

Football clubs in Extremadura
Divisiones Regionales de Fútbol clubs
Association football clubs established in 1969
1969 establishments in Spain
Province of Cáceres